Carlos Javier "Carlitos" González Ozuna (born February 8, 1986) is a Paraguayan footballer who currently plays as a striker for Club Sportivo San Lorenzo in Paraguay.

References

External links
 Profile at liga-indonesia.co.id

1986 births
Living people
Paraguayan footballers
Paraguayan expatriate footballers
Association football forwards
Paraguayan expatriate sportspeople in Indonesia
Expatriate footballers in Indonesia
Liga 1 (Indonesia) players
Persiba Balikpapan players